This is a list of major banks in Indonesia. There are 120 commercial banks in Indonesia (4 state owned banks and 117 private banks). Two of the state owned banks have Islamic banking units. Of the 26 government regional banks, 15 have Islamic banking units, while of 86 private national banks, 7 have Islamic banking unit, and there are five Islamic commercial banks.

Top 10 banks ranked by total assets
As of Q2 2022:

Bank Mandiri 
Bank Rakyat Indonesia (BRI)
Bank Central Asia (BCA) 
Bank Negara Indonesia (BNI) 
Bank Tabungan Negara (BTN) 
CIMB Niaga 
Bank Syariah Indonesia (BSI)
Permata Bank
OCBC NISP
Panin Bank

Central Bank
Bank Indonesia

Conventional banks

Government-owned banks

State-owned

Regional-owned banks

Regional-owned banks are formally instituted as Bank Pembangunan Daerah (Regional Development Bank, abbreviated as BPD).

Private banks

Foreign banks

Islamic Banks

Sharia bank

Government-owned sharia banks 

Bank BNI Syariah and Bank Syariah Mandiri will be merged with Bank BRISyariah as the surviving brand named Bank Syariah Indonesia.

Private sharia banks

Islamic banking unit of conventional banks

Multilateral banks and financial institutions

 World Bank
 International Monetary Fund
 Asian Development Bank

Representative offices in Jakarta

Australia
 National Australia Bank
 Westpac Banking Corporation

Belgium
 Fortis Bank

France
 BNP Paribas
 Caylon Corp and Inv Bank
 Natixis
 Banque Societe Generale Indonesia

Germany
 LBBW (Landesbank Baden-Wuerttemberg)
 Dresdner Bank AG
 Commerzbank AG

India
 ICICI Bank
 Bank of India
 State Bank of India

Japan
 Japan Bank for International Cooperation
 The Sumitomo Trust & Banking Co. Ltd

Netherlands
 ING Bank NV
 NV De Indonesische Overzeese Bank

Singapore
 OCBC Bank
 United Overseas Bank

Switzerland
 EFG Bank
 UBS AG Jakarta Representative Office

Taiwan
 The Exim Bank of Republic of China

United States
 Bank of New York
 Wachovia Bank N.A.

Defunct Banks
 PT Bank IFI (Bank IFI)
 PT Bank Lippo (Lippo Bank)

See also

ATM Bersama
Economy of Indonesia

References

External links
 Regional Banks Association (Asbanda)
 Indonesian Banks Association (Perbanas)

 
Indonesia
Banks
Indonesia